{{Infobox military rank
| name           = Sturmhauptführer / Hauptsturmführer
| image          = 
| caption        = 
| image2         = 
| image3         =
| caption2       = Sturmabteilung (SA) | Schutzstaffel (SS)Gorget patches
| country        = 
| service branch =  Sturmabteilung Schutzstaffel
| abbreviation   = Stuhaf / Hstuff
| rank           =
| NATO rank      = OF-2
| Non-NATO rank  =
| formation      = 
| abolished      = 8 May 1945
| higher rank    = 
| lower rank     = 
| equivalents    = 
| history        =
}}

 (short: Stuhaf), renamed to Hauptsturmführer (short: Hstuf'''), was a Nazi Party paramilitary rank designation used by both the Sturmabteilung (SA) and the Schutzstaffel (SS). The rank was the equivalent of a Hauptmann or Rittmeister in the German Army, which is the equivalent of captain (OF-2) in western militaries.

The rank was first created in 1928 as an SA rank, named SA-Sturmhauptführer until 1939/40, and was bestowed upon those SA officers who were company commanders of SA units. The rank translates as "head storm leader" and can trace its origins to the German shock troops of the First World War, who were typically organized into storm trooper companies under an officer ranked lieutenant or captain. SA-Hauptsturmführer was initially considered as more of a senior lieutenant, but after 1932 the rank was rated above that of SA-Obersturmführer and became the equivalent of a captain. The insignia for the rank was also modified to denote the higher status.

As an SS rank, SS-Sturmhauptführer was established in 1930 as a senior rank to that of SS-Hauptsturmführer. In 1934, after the Night of the Long Knives, the SS changed the name to SS-Hauptsturmführer. This was due in large part to separate the SS rank system from the SA, which by then was considered two completely separate organizations. Sturmhauptführer remained an SA rank until 1939/40, and was finally changed to Hauptsturmführer''.

Notes

References

SS ranks